Rear Admiral Mark William Graham Kerr (born 18 February 1949) is a former Royal Navy officer who went on to be Chief Executive of Powys County Council.

Naval career
Kerr joined the Royal Navy in 1967, aged 18. He was given command of the patrol boat  in waters off Northern Ireland in 1976 and the minesweeper  in waters off Hong Kong in 1982. After a period with the Schools Presentation Team and then as executive officer on a larger ship, he was given command of the frigate  in 1988 and the frigate  in 1994. He was appointed Deputy Flag Officer, Sea Training in 1997, Commodore of the Royal Naval College, Dartmouth in 1999 and Naval Secretary in 2002. He retired in 2004.

Later life
In retirement he became Chief Executive of Powys County Council in May 2004 and interim Director of the National Botanic Garden of Wales in October 2009.

Personal life
He lives in Llangors, Powys with his wife, Louisa. They have two sons and a daughter.

References

1949 births
British military personnel of The Troubles (Northern Ireland)
Living people
People from Brecknockshire
Royal Navy rear admirals
Maltese people